The 2014 Big Ten women's basketball tournament was a tournament from March 6 through March 9 at Bankers Life Fieldhouse in Indianapolis, IN.  The first round, quarterfinals and semifinals games was televised on the Big Ten Network and the championship was on ESPN. Nebraska defeated Iowa to win their first Big Ten Title in women's basketball history. With that win, the Cornhuskers received the Big Ten Conference's automatic bid to the 2014 NCAA tournament.

Seeds
All 12 Big Ten schools participated in the tournament. Teams were seeded by 2013–14 Big Ten Conference season record. The top 4 teams received a first-round bye.

Seeding for the tournament was determined at the close of the regular conference season:

Schedule

Bracket

See also
2014 Big Ten Conference men's basketball tournament

References

Tournament
Big Ten women's basketball tournament
Big Ten women's basketball tournament
Basketball competitions in Indianapolis
Big Ten women's basketball tournament
College basketball tournaments in Indiana
Women's sports in Indiana